Heiser is a surname. Notable people with the surname include:

 Charles Bixler Heiser (1920–2010), American botanist
 Francis Heiser (died 1952), British priest
 Gernot Heiser (born 1957), Australian professor
 Joseph M. Heiser Jr., American general
 Michael S. Heiser, American scholar and author
 Rolland V. Heiser, American general
 Roy Heiser (born 1942), American baseball player
 Willem Heiser (born 1949), Dutch social scientist

Surnames